Arthur Thornton LaPrade (March 3, 1895 – June 30, 1957) was a justice of the Supreme Court of Arizona from January 1, 1945 until his death in 1957. He served as chief justice from January 1949 to December 1950 and from January 1955 to December 1956.

Biography
LaPrade was raised in Winslow, Arizona, the son of Elizabeth "Lizzie" Dover (1858–1911) and Fernando Thornton "Ferd" LaPrade (1852–1936). The LaPrade family is credited with building the Winslow Opera House in Winslow, Arizona. LaPrade graduated from University of California at Berkeley and University of California Berkeley Law School in 1920. In 1923 he was Assistant Maricopa County Attorney and in 1925 he was appointed Maricopa County Attorney. Between 1933–1935 he was Arizona Attorney General and oversaw the conviction and sentence of Winnie Ruth Judd.  From 1939–1945 LaPrade served as a Superior Court Judge. He was elected to the Supreme Court in 1947 and was Chief Justice twice. LaPrade married Lucile "Lucy" Hooper (1892–1983) and had four children, two of them went on to become attorneys. After his death on June 30, 1957 in Phoenix, LaPrade was buried in the Greenwood Memory Lawn Cemetery.

References

External links
 
 Arthur T. LaPrade on the website of Arizona Health Sciences Library
 Arizona State Archives  Photo by Arthur T. LaPrade

1895 births
1957 deaths
People from Winslow, Arizona
Chief Justices of the Arizona Supreme Court
University of California, Berkeley alumni
Justices of the Arizona Supreme Court
20th-century American judges